Fox Jackson-Keen (born 1995 in Hornsey, England) is an English stage and television actor, singer and dancer. He is known for his shared performances in a two and a half-year run as the star role of 'Billy' in Billy Elliot the Musical at London's Victoria Palace Theatre. He has appeared as Mobbsy in the 26 episode live action children's comedy series, My Phone Genie, on ITV and CITV.

Career
Jackson-Keen has appeared in a wide range of advertising campaigns and TV shows, and competed four times in the UK National Gymnastics finals.  He received the first name of "Fox" because his father was a fan of the TV's The X Files.  His father was a gymnast, and in initially followed in his father's footsteps, Fox entered and won several youth competitions before representing London in a national competition, where he came third. At 9-years-old in 2006, he started break-dancing and hip-hop, and then studied ballet and tap.

His broadcast career began in 2006 with a role in the UK television series The Bill, and in the award-winning film Terry Pratchett's Hogfather.

From June 2008 to March 2010, Jackson-Keen played the role of Billy in Billy Elliot the Musical in London.  When cast at 12½ years old, he became the 16th boy to play that role.  His 23 June 2008 debut marked the first Londoner to play that role. At 14½ years old, and after 205 performances, he retired from the role of Billy on 27 March 2010 as the oldest of the 'Billys'.

On 8 March 2010, Jackson-Keen and three other boys from the cast were invited to 10 Downing Street, and met with Prime Minister Gordon Brown, Alistair Darling, Peter Mandelson and Minister for Culture and Tourism Margaret Hodge.

In 2013, he appeared as Roger in the Teatro Kismet touring production of the Philip Pullman novel I Was a Rat! or The Scarlet Slippers, in the United Kingdom.

Television
 The Bill (1 episode, 2006)
 Terry Pratchett's Hogfather (2006) (TV)
 Hyperdrive (1 episode, 2007)
 This Morning (1 episode, 2008)
 What's on Theatre (1 episode, 2008)
 The Alan Titchmarsh Show (1 episode, 2010)
 Doctors (1 episode, 2012)
 My Phone Genie (2012)
 Sadie J (1 episode, 2013)
 Casualty (1 episode, 2014)
  New Tricks (1 episode, 2014)

References

External links

English male musical theatre actors
Living people
1995 births
English male dancers
English singers
English male television actors
People from Hornsey